Alpine skiing at the 1988 Winter Paralympics consisted of 44 events, 29 for men and 15 for women.

Medal table

Medal summary 
The competition events were:
Downhill: men - women
Giant slalom: men - women
Slalom: men - women

Each event had separate standing, sitting, or visually impaired classifications:

LW2 - standing: single leg amputation above the knee
LW 3 - standing: double leg amputation below the knee, mild cerebral palsy, or equivalent impairment
LW4 - standing: single leg amputation below the knee
LW5/7 - standing: double arm amputation
LW6/8 - standing: single arm amputation
LW9 - standing: amputation or equivalent impairment of one arm and one leg
LW 10 - sitting: paraplegia with no or some upper abdominal function and no functional sitting balance
B1 - visually impaired: no functional vision
B2 - visually impaired: up to ca 3-5% functional vision
B3 - visually impaired: under 10% functional vision

Men's events 

* In the Men's Slalom LW3, all four skiers were disqualified

Women's events

See also
Alpine skiing at the 1988 Winter Olympics

References 

 

 

 Winter Sport Classification, Canadian Paralympic Committee

 
1988 Winter Paralympics events
1988
Paralympics